S3 is a line on the Berlin S-Bahn. It operates from Erkner to Spandau.

S3 originally was shortened to Ostbahnhof from 2003 to 2009 while awaiting renovation works. Then, it temporarily shortened to Ostkreuz.

References

Berlin S-Bahn lines